Dan Lagana is an American television writer and producer. He is best known for creating the TV series Zach Stone Is Gonna Be Famous on MTV and for serving as showrunner on the Netflix series American Vandal. He has won a Peabody Award.

Career 
Lagana served as showrunner (and co-creator) on Zach Stone Is Gonna Be Famous with Bo Burnham on MTV as well as showrunner on Seasons 2 and 3 of the Hulu comedy TV series Deadbeat. He has developed projects for Fox, CBS, NBC, and a web series for Lionsgate Television. Lagana started out as a production assistant on the Fox show Malcolm in the Middle.

In 2019, Lagana co-wrote the script for The Babysitter: Killer Queen (2020) for Netflix, starring Judah Lewis, Hana Mae Lee, Robbie Amell, Bella Thorne, Andrew Bachelor, Leslie Bibb, Ken Marino, and Jenna Ortega.

American Vandal 
Lagana was the showrunner on Season 1 of American Vandal and returned for Season 2. Vandal was Netflix's most binge-watched show of 2017. On April 19, 2018, American Vandal won a 2017 Peabody Award for Entertainment. In July 2018, it was nominated for a Primetime Emmy Award.

Personal life 
Lagana is married to actress, television producer, and writer Emily Kapnek. They have two children, Guy Lagana and Oszkar Nosek.

References 

Year of birth missing (living people)
Living people
American television producers
People from Boston